"Spread Your Wings" is a power ballad by the rock band Queen, from their 1977 album News of the World. Written by bassist John Deacon, it was released as the A-side of the single "Spread Your Wings"/"Sheer Heart Attack" in 1978.  According to music writer Benoit Clerc, "Spread Your Wings" was chosen as the 2nd single from News of the World because the band regretted releasing "Tie Your Mother Down" as a single from A Day at the Races over Deacon's "You and I."

Background
The lyrics of "Spread Your Wings" tells of a character named Sammy, who works cleaning floors at a bar but dreams of improving his life despite his boss telling him that he has no ambition.  Deacon has said: 

Queen FAQ author Daniel Ross described "Spread Your Wings" as Deacon's "first attempt at narrative songwriting."  Queen lead singer Freddie Mercury considered it to be the best song Deacon had written to date.

Musicologist Nick Braae describes the structure of "Spread Your Wings" as being somewhat unusual, in that after the initial verse and refrain centered on the key of D major, there is a bridge centered on the key of B minor, followed by an instrumental bridge that starts moving back to D major for the next verse-refrain pair.  Deacon used this double-bridge strategy in several other songs, including "You and I" and "Need Your Loving Tonight."

The track features Freddie Mercury on piano and vocals, Brian May on electric guitar, Roger Taylor on drums, and John Deacon on bass and acoustic guitars. 

The song is unusual for Queen in that it uses a 3rd person narrative.  It is also the only Queen single that does not have the rest of the group providing backing vocals to Mercury's lead.

"Spread Your Wings" was not released as a single in North America. However, the live version from Live Killers was featured as the B-side to Queen's 1979 hit, "Crazy Little Thing Called Love", which reached number one on the US Billboard Hot 100.

Reception
Dayton Daily News critic Gary Nuhn called it "a song with Beatles-like lyrics of a man pulling himself up.  Courier-News critic Bill Bleyer says that it makes a similar point as the more popular song, "We Are the Champions," – that "while the established order continues to hold down the young, they can still make it if they try" – it does so better and "without overpowering the listener."  Ross described it as a "melancholy anthem" that has "the same sense of bombast as 'We Are the Champions' but shot through with existential sadness and a desire to burst the shackles of mundane employment."

Clerc praised Mercury's vocal delivery, saying that he sang the song "superbly, emphasizing the lyrics with his compelling vocal dexterity."  Andrew Wild said that it's a "commercial song with a terrific chorus" and is "sung with real conviction by Freddie Mercury."

Ultimate Classic Rock critic Eduardo Rivadavia rated the song as the 4th best song Deacon wrote for Queen, praising its "rising appreciation of musical drama."  Classic Rock History critic Millie Zeiler rated it John Deacon's 4th best Queen song.

A live version of the song appears on the band's 1979 album Live Killers. The song peaked at number 34 in the UK Singles Chart.

Music video
The music video for "Spread Your Wings" was shot in January 1978 in the garden of Roger Taylor's house in Surrey, on the same day the band also shot the video for "We Will Rock You."  The video was directed by Rock Flicks.

Personnel
Freddie Mercury - lead vocals, piano
Brian May - electric guitar
Roger Taylor - drums, percussion
John Deacon - bass guitar, acoustic guitar

Charts

Cover versions
This song was covered by German power metal band Blind Guardian on their 1992 album Somewhere Far Beyond. The same recording reappeared on their 1996 album The Forgotten Tales.

References

External links

Queen (band) songs
Hard rock ballads
1978 singles
1970s ballads
Songs written by John Deacon
Song recordings produced by Mike Stone (record producer)
1977 songs
EMI Records singles
Elektra Records singles
Hollywood Records singles
British hard rock songs